The watershed of the Delaware River drains an area of  and encompasses 42 counties and 838 municipalities in five U.S. states—New York, New Jersey, Pennsylvania, Maryland, and Delaware.  This total area constitutes approximately 0.4% of the land mass in the United States. The Delaware River rises in New York's Catskill Mountains flowing southward for 419 miles (674 km) into Delaware Bay where its waters enter the Atlantic Ocean near Cape May in New Jersey and Cape Henlopen in Delaware. There are 216 tributary streams and creeks—an estimated 14,057 miles of streams and creeks—in the watershed.

The waters of the Delaware River's basin are used to sustain "fishing, transportation, power, cooling, recreation, and other industrial and residential purposes." While the watershed is home to 4.17 million people according to the 2000 Federal Census, these bodies of water provide drinking water to 17 million people—roughly 10% of the population of the United States. It is the 33rd largest river in the United States in terms of flow, but the nation's most heavily used rivers in daily volume of tonnage. The average annual flow rate of the Delaware is 11,700 cubic feet per second at Trenton, New Jersey.

Tributaries of the Delaware River
The main tributaries in New York are the Mongaup and  Neversink rivers and Callicoon Creek. From Pennsylvania, the major tributaries are the Lackawaxen, Lehigh, and Schuylkill rivers. From New Jersey, the Big Flatbrook, Pequest, Musconetcong, and Maurice rivers, plus Oldmans, Raccoon and Rancocas creeks, flow into the Delaware.

Tributaries are arranged generally north to south from the source of the river to its mouth, its confluence with the Delaware River, tributaries within that rivers' watershed are mentioned in notes.

Tributaries in New York

West Branch Delaware River
Little Delaware River
East Branch Delaware River
Beaver Kill
Willowemoc Creek
Little Beaver Kill
Tremper Kill
Callicoon Creek
East Branch Callicoon Creek
North Branch Callicoon Creek
Tenmile River
Mongaup River
Black Brook
West Branch Mongaup River
Middle Mongaup River
East Mongaup River
Neversink River
Basher Kill
Sheldrake Stream
East Branch Neversink River
West Branch Neversink River

Tributaries in Pennsylvania

West Branch Delaware River
Shehawken Creek
Equinunk Creek
Lackawaxen River
Wallenpaupack Creek
West Branch Wallenpaupack Creek
East Branch Wallenpaupack Creek
Bridge Creek
Middle Creek
Carley Brook
Dyberry Creek
Van Auken Creek
West Branch Lackawaxen River
Johnson Creek
Shohola Creek
Big Bushkill Creek
Little Bush Kill
Saw Creek
Rock Hill Creek
Sawkill Creek
Dwarf Kill
Raymondskill Creek
Brodhead Creek
Marshalls Creek
Pocono Creek
McMichael Creek
Paradise Creek
Levitt Branch
Middle Branch Brodhead Creek
Cherry Creek (along the Appalachian Trail)
Caledonia Creek (along the Appalachian Trail)
Martins Creek
Bushkill Creek

Lehigh River
Saucon Creek
Monocacy Creek
Little Lehigh Creek
Jordan Creek
Spring Creek
Swabia Creek
Catasauqua Creek
Coplay Creek
Hokendauqua Creek
Indian Creek
Trout Creek
Aquashicola Creek
Buckwha Creek
Lizard Creek
Pohopoco Creek
Mahoning Creek
Mauch Chunk Creek/White Bear Creek
Nesquehoning Creek
Jeans Run
Black Creek
Quakake Creek
Hazle Creek
Mud Run
Bear Creek
Tobyhanna Creek
Tunkhannock Creek
South Branch Tunkhannock Creek
Cooks Creek
Hollow Run
Rodges Run
Gallows Run
Falls Creek
Swamp Creek
Tinicum Creek
Rapp Creek
Beaver Creek
Smithtown Creek
Tohickon Creek
Dry Branch Creek
Beaver Run
Linking Run
Morgan Creek
Dimple Creek
Threemile Run
Haycock Creek
Mink Run
Deer Run
Wolf Run
Deep Run
Cabin Run
Geddes Run
Hickory Creek
Paunnacussing Creek
Cuttalosa Creek
Rabbit Run
Aquetong Creek
Dark Hollow Run
Pidcock Creek
Curls Run
Jericho Creek
Houghs Creek
Dyers Creek
Buck Creek
Brock Creek
Biles Creek
Scotts Creek
Martins Creek
Mill Creek
Adams Hollow Creek
Black Ditch Creek
Queen Anne Creek
Neshaminy Creek
West Branch Neshaminy Creek
Reading Creek
North Branch Neshaminy Creek
Pine Run
Mill Creek
Cooks Run
Little Neshaminy Creek
Park Creek
Mill Creek
Lahaska Creek
Watson Creek
Robin Run
Newtown Creek
Core Creek
Mill Creek
Ironworks Creek
Pine Run
Poquessing Creek
Byberry Creek
Bloody Run
Pennypack Creek
Frankford Creek
Tacony Creek
Wingohocking Creek
Cohocksink Creek
Cohoquinoque Creek

Schuylkill River
Mingo Creek (former Cobbs Creek tributary)
Mill Creek (Philadelphia)
Wissahickon Creek
Paper Mill Run
Cresheim Creek
Sandy Run
Mill Creek (Montgomery County, Pennsylvania)
Stoney Creek
Valley Creek
Perkiomen Creek
Skippack Creek
Towamencin Creek
East Branch Perkiomen Creek
Swamp Creek
Unami Creek
West Branch Perkiomen Creek
Hosensack Creek
Pickering Creek
French Creek
Scotts Run
Pigeon Creek
Manatawny Creek
Ironstone Creek
Little Manatawny Creek
Monocacy Creek
Hay Creek
Antietam Creek
Allegheny Creek
Angelica Creek
Wyomissing Creek
Tulpehocken Creek
Cacoosing Creek
Northkill Creek
Little Northkill Creek
Wolf Creek
Maiden Creek
Sacony Creek
Kistler Creek
Ontelaunee Creek
Irish Creek
Little Schuylkill River
Indian Run
Panther Creek
Pine Creek
West Branch Schuylkill River
West West Branch Schuylkill River
West Creek
Norwegian Creek
Mill Creek (Port Carbon, Pennsylvania)
Silver Creek
Darby Creek
Stoney Creek
Muckinipattis Creek
Hermesprota Creek
Cobbs Creek
Naylors Run
Indian Creek
Ithan Creek
Meadowbrook Run
Little Darby Creek
Crum Creek
Little Crum Creek
Trout Run
West Crum Creek
Whiskey Run
Richard's Run
Ridley Creek
Vernon Run
Spring Run
Dismal Run
Hunters Run
Chester Creek
West Branch Chester Creek
Goose Creek
Stoney Creek
Naamans Creek
Christina River
Brandywine Creek
East Branch Brandywine Creek
Valley Creek
West Branch Brandywine Creek
Buck Run
Doe Run
White Clay Creek
Red Clay Creek
Mill Creek
Broad Run
Walnut Run

Tributaries in New Jersey

The Appalachian Trail crosses the following tributaries or the watersheds of these tributaries in New Jersey: (1) Flat Brook (Big Flat brook), (Little Flat Brook), Dunnfield Creek, Stony Brook (Shawpocussing Creek), Paulins Kill (via its tributary Yards Creek and Jacksonburg Creek).

 Flat Brook
Big Flat Brook
Little Flat Brook
 Van Campens Creek
 Dunnfield Creek
 Stony Brook (Shawpocussing Creek)
Paulins Kill 
Yards Creek
Pequest River
Beaver Brook
Bear Creek
Lopatcong Creek
Pohatcong Creek
Musconetcong River 
Lubbers Run
Punkhorn Creek
Hakihokake Creek
Harihokake Creek
Nishisakawick Creek
Little Nishisakawick Creek
Lockatong Creek
Wickecheoke Creek
Alexauken Creek
Swan Creek
Moores Creek
Fiddlers Creek
Jacobs Creek
Assunpink Creek
Shabakunk Creek
Crosswicks Creek
Assiscunk Creek
Rancocas Creek
North Branch Rancocas Creek
Greenwood Branch
Bisphams Mill Creek
Pole Bridge Branch
Mount Misery Brook
South Branch Rancocas Creek
Friendship Creek
Burrs Mill Brook
Southwest Branch Rancocas Creek
Pennsauken Creek
Cooper River
Big Timber Creek
Woodbury Creek
Mantua Creek
Raccoon Creek
Oldmans Creek
Salem River
Fenwick Creek
Mannington Creek
Game Creek
Alloway Creek

Tributaries in Delaware

Naamans Creek
South Branch Naamans Creek
Perkins Run
Stoney Creek
Shellpot Creek
Matson Run
Turkey Run
Christina River
Brandywine Creek
Alapocas Run
Husbands Run
Willow Run
Wilson Run
Rocky Run
Hurricane Run
Carney Run
Ramsey Run
Beaver Creek
Little Mill Creek
Chestnut Run
Willow Run
Nonesuch Creek
White Clay Creek
Hershey Run
Red Clay Creek
Hyde Run
Mill Creek
Pike Creek
Middle Run
Leathermans Run
Muddy Run
Belltown Run
West Branch Christina River
Persimmon Run
East Branch Christina River
Army Creek
Tom Creek
Red Lion Creek
Doll Run
Cedar Creek
Dragon Creek

Tributaries of Delaware Bay

Delaware Bay is a major estuary outlet of the Delaware River on the Northeast seaboard of the United States whose fresh water mixes for many miles with the waters of the Atlantic Ocean. The bay, as an estuary, forms a transitional zone between the river environment provided by the Delaware River and maritime environment of the Atlantic Ocean that is subject to both marine influences, such as tides, waves, and the influx of saline water; and riverine influences, such as flows of fresh water and sediment. The bay is bordered by the State of New Jersey and the State of Delaware. The bay's outermost boundary separating it from the Atlantic are two capes: Cape Henlopen and Cape May.

Tributaries in New Jersey
Stow Creek
Cedar Creek
Nantuxent Creek
Oranoaken Creek
Dividing Creek
Cohansey River
Back Creek
Ogden Creek
Abbots Creek
Maurice River
Muskee Creek
Manumuskin River
Manantico Creek
Muddy Run
Scotland Run
Still Run
West Creek
East Creek
Dennis Creek
Roaring Ditch
Sluice Creek
Fishing Creek
Fulling Mill Stream

Tributaries in Delaware
Saint Georges Creek
Scott Run
Joy Run
Crystal Run
Augustine Creek
Silver Run
Appoquinimink River
The Big Ditch
Hangmans Run
Drawyer Creek
Blackbird Creek
Fishing Creek
Beaver Branch
Barlow Branch
Sandom Branch
Angle Rod Creek
Smyrna River
Sawmill Branch
Corks Point Ditch
Morris Branch
Green Spring Branch
Massey Branch
Duck Creek
Providence Creek
Paw Paw Branch
Taylors Gut
Duck Creek
Quarter Gut
Hawkey Branch
Leipsic River
Raymond Gut
Dyke Branch
Bennefield Branch
Spruances Branch
Snows Branch
Alston Branch
Willis Branch
Simons River
Herring Branch
Green Creek
Muddy Branch
Mahon River
Old Womans Gut
Little River
Lewis Ditch
Sand Ditch
St. Jones River
Cypress Branch
Tidbury Creek
Isaac Branch
Puncheon Run
Fork Branch
Murderkill River
Spring Creek
Double Run
Hudson Branch
Pratt Branch
Ash Gut
Browns Branch
Ward Branch
Spring Branch
Brockonbridge Gut
Mispillion River
Fishing Branch
Swan Creek
Deep Branch
Mullet Run
Bowman Branch
Lednum Branch
Johnson Branch
Tantrough Branch
Beaverdam Branch
Cedar Creek
Slaughter Creek
Beaverdam Branch
Church Branch
Broadkill River
Canary Creek
Broadkill Sound
Primehook Creek
North Prong
Sowbridge Branch
Ingram Branch
Old Mill Creek
Fisher Creek
Black Hog Gut
Martin Branch
Crooked Creek
Doty Glade
Beaverdam Creek
Round Pole Branch
Ingram Branch
Pemberton Branch

See also
 List of rivers of Delaware
 List of rivers of Maryland
 List of rivers of New Jersey
 List of rivers of New York
 List of rivers of Pennsylvania

References

External links
 Delaware River and Bay Authority
 Delaware River Basin Commission
 Delaware River Joint Toll Bridge Commission
 Delaware River Port Authority Official Website
 Delaware Riverkeeper Network
 National Park Service: Delaware Water Gap National Recreation Area
 National Park Service: Upper Delaware Scenic & Recreational River
 National Park Service: Lower Delaware Wild & Scenic River

Delaware River
Wild and Scenic Rivers of the United States
Catskill/Delaware watersheds
Delaware Valley
Delaware Water Gap National Recreation Area
Borders of New York (state)
Borders of Delaware
Borders of New Jersey
Borders of Pennsylvania
Delaware